Events in the year 1802 in Norway.

Incumbents
Monarch: Christian VII

Events
 9 July - The Lærdal  Rebellion ends.
 Lærdalske lette infanterikompani was formed.

Arts and literature
 Det Dramatiske Selskab in Trondheim was founded.

Births

28 July – Hans Conrad Thoresen, priest and politician (d.1858)
5 August – Niels Henrik Abel, mathematician (d.1829).
7 October – Magnus Brostrup Landstad, minister, psalmist and poet (d.1880)
10 October – Leonhard Christian Borchgrevink Holmboe, priest and politician (d.1887)
10 November – Karelius August Arntzen, politician (d.1876)

Full date unknown
Søren Jørgensen Aandahl, politician (d.1886)
Christian Ludvig Diriks, politician and Minister (d.1873)
Johan Widing Heiberg Landmark, jurist and politician (d.1878)

Deaths
 1 January - Peder Harboe Hertzberg, potato priest (b.1728)
 13 February - Jakob Edvard Colbjørnsen, chief justice (b.1744)

References

See also